David Bianculli is an American TV critic, columnist, radio personality, non-fiction author and university professor. Bianculli has served as the television critic for NPR's radio show Fresh Air since the Philadelphia-based show went national in 1987, and regularly fills in for the show's long-time host, Terry Gross. He is the founder and editor-in-chief of the website TVWorthWatching.com, and an associate professor of TV and film history at Rowan University in Glassboro, New Jersey.

Early life and education
Bianculli showed an early interest in television, even making notes about TV shows in his childhood diary. A graduate of Nova High School in Ft. Lauderdale, Florida, Bianculli received a B.S. in Journalism from the University of Florida in 1975 and an M.A. in Journalism and Communication from the University of Florida in 1977. In 1995, Bianculli was named an Alumnus of Distinction by UF's College of Journalism and Communications.

Career
While attending the University of Florida in Gainesville, Bianculli convinced an editor at the Gainesville Sun to let him "write a review of a brand-new TV show aimed at college kids, since I was a college kid and Gainesville was a college town." That show was Saturday Night Live. Bianculli continued writing television reviews for the Sun, at $5 per review, while completing his master's degree.

Bianculli worked as a TV critic for the Ft. Lauderdale News/Sun Sentinel from 1977 to 1980, which was followed by stints at the Akron Beacon Journal (1980-1983) and The Philadelphia Inquirer (1983-1987). In 1987, he was named TV critic for the New York Post, then jumped to the rival New York Daily News, where he remained from 1993 to 2007. Bianculli also briefly served as TV critic for the TV trade magazine Broadcasting & Cable.

On November 5, 2007, the day his farewell column ran in the New York Daily News, Bianculli launched his web magazine, TVWorthWatching.com.

Bianculli is the author of four books, Teleliteracy: Taking Television Seriously; Dictionary of Teleliteracy: Television's 500 Biggest Hits, Misses, and Events; Dangerously Funny: The Uncensored Story of 'The Smothers Brothers Comedy Hour', a history of the Smothers Brothers television variety show; and The Platinum Age of Television: From I Love Lucy to The Walking Dead, How TV Became Terrific. In 2011, Smokehouse Pictures, the production company owned by George Clooney and Grant Heslov, and Sony Pictures optioned the rights to Dangerously Funny.

Bianculli sits on the Advisory Council for the Fred Rogers Center for Early Learning and Children's Media at Saint Vincent College, Latrobe, PA. He is a member of the Broadcast Television Journalists Association and a founding member of the Television Critics Association.

In 2013, the website Complex included Bianculli in its list of "The 25 Best TV Bloggers Right Now".

Bianculli has been a resident of Cherry Hill, New Jersey, since 1987.

Books
The Platinum Age of Television: From I Love Lucy to The Walking Dead, How TV Became Terrific. New York: Anchor Books, 2016. Paperback: ; eBook: .
Dangerously Funny: The Uncensored Story of "The Smothers Brothers Comedy Hour". New York: Touchstone/Simon & Schuster, 2009. Hardback: ; Paperback: .
Dictionary of Teleliteracy: Television's 500 Biggest Hits, Misses, and Events. New York: Continuum Publishing Co., 1996; Syracuse: Syracuse University Press, paperback, 1997. Hardback: ; Paperback: .
Teleliteracy: Taking Television Seriously. New York: Continuum Publishing Co., 1992. Touchstone/Simon & Schuster, paperback, 1994. Hardback: ; Paperback: .

Bianculli has also contributed articles or chapters to various publications. They include:

"Twin Peaks" in The Essential Cult TV Reader. David Lavery, ed. Lexington, KY: University of Kentucky Press, 2010. .
"Quality TV: A U.S. TV Critic's Perspective" in Reading Quality TV: American Television and Beyond. Janet McCabe and Kim Akass, eds. London: I.B. Tauris & Co., 2007. Hardback:  Paperback: .
"The CSI Phenomenon" in Reading CSI: Crime Television Under the Microscope. Michael Allen, ed. London: I.B. Tauris & Co., 2007. Paperback: .
"The Myth, the Man, the Legend," in Mister Rogers' Neighborhood: Children, Television, and Fred Rogers. Mark Collins and Margaret Mary Kimmel, eds. Pittsburgh: University of Pittsburgh Press, 1996. Hardback:  Paperback: .
"The Theory of Evolution, According to Vonnegut (A Review of Galapagos)," in The Critical Response to Kurt Vonnegut. Leonard Mustazza, ed. Westport, Conn.: Greenwood Press, 1994. .

References

External links
Official website
NPR's Fresh Air website
New York Daily News archives
Rowan University, College of Communications & Creative Arts: Radio, TV & Film
Simon and Schuster website

20th-century American male writers
20th-century American non-fiction writers
21st-century American male writers
21st-century American non-fiction writers
American television critics
Journalists from Florida
Living people
New York Daily News people
NPR personalities
People from Cherry Hill, New Jersey
Rowan University faculty
The Philadelphia Inquirer people
University of Florida alumni
Year of birth missing (living people)